Adam Niswander (February 2, 1946 – August 12, 2012) was an American short story writer and novelist.  He was a president of the Central Arizona Speculative Fiction Society and a member of the Horror Writers Association and the  Science Fiction and Fantasy Writers of America.  His first novel, The Charm, which is the first book of his Shaman Cycle was published by Integra Press in 1993.  He died on 12 August 2012.

Works

The Shaman Cycle
The Charm (Integra Press, 1993)
The Serpent Slayers (Integra Press, 1994)
The Hound Hunters (Hippocampus Press, 2008)
The War of the Whisperers (Hippocampus Press, 2009)
The Nemesis of Night (Hippocampus Press, 2010)

Others
The Sand Dwellers (Fedogan & Bremer, 1998)
The Cost of the Cure (Midnight shambler, 1998)
The Repository (Meisha Merlin Publishing, 1999)

Notes

References

External links

1946 births
2012 deaths
20th-century American novelists
21st-century American novelists
American horror writers
American fantasy writers
American male novelists
American short story writers
Cthulhu Mythos writers
People from Flushing, Queens
Novelists from Arizona
Writers from Queens, New York
American male short story writers
Novelists from New York (state)
20th-century American male writers
21st-century American male writers